Every kilometer is a Bulgarian Televised-movie series from the late 1960s and early 1970s.

The series consists of 26 episodes divided into two parts as 13 episodes - the first covering the period between 1923 and September 9, 1944, and the second one - after it. The main characters are Nikola Dejanov, played by Stefan Danailov and Dimitar Bombov, nicknamed "Mitko Bombata" (Mitko the Bomb), played by Grigor Vachkov. They are childhood friends, both communists, spies, and partisans.

Among the writers of the film are Pavel Vezhinov, and the poet and dissident Georgi Markov. Directors of the series are Lubomir Sharlandjiev and Nedelcho Chernev. The production is funded by the ruling Bulgarian Communist Party and is dedicated to the 25th anniversary of the coup of September 9, 1944, presented as a popular uprising.

Cambodian release
Bayon Television was released by 2016. It was Khmer dubbed version voiced by the Cambodians (its title in Cambodian was រាល់គីឡូម៉ែត្រ). The tele-movie series was released only in Phnom Penh, Cambodia and Vietnam under VTV Vietnam.

External links 
 
 
 Every kilometer I (1969)
 Every kilometer II (1971)

Bulgarian television series
1960s Bulgarian television series
1970s Bulgarian television series
World War II television series